The Department of Economic Development, Jobs, Transport and Resources (DEDJTR)  is a former department of the Government of Victoria. It was created on 1 January 2015 by the government of Premier Daniel Andrews when the number of government departments was reduced from 9 to 7, and assumed responsibility for ministerial portfolios previously spread across 5 departments. It was abolished at the end of 2018 and divided into two new departments.

Governance and history 
The department was established after the 2014 Victorian state election by the new Labor government, using the powers of the Premier of Victoria and the Governor-in-council under the Public Administration Act 2004 and the Administrative Arrangements Act 1983. Its establishment was part of a reorganisation of the Victorian public sector which combined the functions of 9 departments into 7, following a similar process after the 2010 election which reduced the number of departments from 11 to 9. The new department absorbed all the functions of the Department of State Development, Business and Innovation; the agricultural, forestry and fisheries operations of the Department of Environment and Primary Industries; the transport responsibilities of the Department of Transport, Planning and Local Infrastructure; and the Industrial Relations Victoria and Arts Victoria agencies from the Department of Treasury and Finance and the Department of Premier and Cabinet respectively.

An inquiry into the changes was launched by the Legal and Social Issues Committee of the Victorian Legislative Council in 2015. The inquiry was told that the new, larger department was better able to collaborate and promote "liveability" through its functions.

On 29 November 2018, following the re-election of the Labor Party in the 2018 Victorian state election, it was announced that DEDJTR would be broken up into two new departments: a Department of Transport and a Department of Jobs, Precincts and Regions. The changes took effect on 1 January 2019.

Overview 
The department supports the following 11 ministerial portfolios and their corresponding agencies:
Agriculture
Agriculture Victoria Services
Biosciences Research Centre Joint Venture Board
Dairy Food Safety Victoria
Game Management Authority
Geoffrey Gardiner Dairy Foundation
Greater Sunraysia Pest Free Area Industry Development Committee
Melbourne Market Authority
Murray Valley Wine Grape Industry Development Committee
PrimeSafe
Royal Melbourne Showgrounds Joint Venture Board
VicForests
Victorian Strawberry Industry Development Committee
Veterinary Practitioners Registration Board of Victoria
Creative Industries
Arts Centre Melbourne
Australian Centre for the Moving Image
Docklands Studios Melbourne
Film Victoria
Geelong Performing Arts Centre
Melbourne Recital Centre
Museum Victoria
National Gallery of Victoria
State Library of Victoria
Employment
Energy and Resources
Industry
Ports
Port of Hastings Development Authority
Port of Melbourne Corporation
Victorian Regional Channels Authority
Victorian Ports Corporation
Public Transport
Chief Investigator, Transport Safety
Level Crossing Removal Authority
Melbourne Metro Rail Authority
Public Transport Victoria
Taxi Services Commission
Transport Safety Victoria
V/Line Corporation
VicTrack
Regional Development
Regional Development Victoria
Roads and Road Safety
Transport Accident Commission
VicRoads
Small Business, Innovation and Trade
Launch Victoria
Office of the Small Business Commissioner
Tourism and Major Events
Australian Grand Prix Corporation
Emerald Tourist Railway Board
Federation Square Pty Ltd
Melbourne and Olympic Parks Trust
Melbourne Convention and Exhibition Trust
Melbourne Cricket Ground Trust
Visit Victoria

The department secretary was Richard Bolt, brother of journalist Andrew Bolt, previously head of the Department of Environment and Primary Industries.

References 

Former government departments of Victoria (Australia)
Transport in Victoria (Australia)
2015 establishments in Australia
Ministries established in 2015
Ministries disestablished in 2018
2018 disestablishments in Australia